Sampson Tangombu Chiragia (born 24 October 1966) is a Ghanaian politician and member of the National Democratic Congress. He is the member of parliament for the Navrongo Central Constituency in the Upper West Region of Ghana.

Early life and education 
Chiragia hails from Navrongo. He holds an MBA in Financial management.

References 

Living people
Ghanaian MPs 2021–2025
People from Upper West Region
National Democratic Congress (Ghana) politicians
1966 births